After the defeat of France in the Revolutionary and Napoleonic Wars (1792–1815), the British Empire emerged as the principal naval and imperial power of the 19th century. Unchallenged at sea, British dominance was later described as Pax Britannica ("British Peace"), a period of relative peace in Europe and the world (1815–1914) during which the British Empire became the global hegemon and adopted the role of global policeman. In the early 19th century, the Industrial Revolution began to transform Britain; by the time of the Great Exhibition in 1851 the country was described as the "workshop of the world".

Economic statistics

The following table gives gross domestic product (GDP) estimates of the British Empire and its territories in 1870 and 1913, as a percentage of the world economy and the empire's economy, along with comparisons to the United States and Russian Empire. The British imperial territory with the largest economy in 1870 was British India (including what are now Pakistan and Bangladesh), followed by the United Kingdom. The territory with the largest economy in 1913 was the United Kingdom, followed by British India. The table does not include GDP estimates for British African territories other than British Egypt.

See also
 Demographics of the British Empire
 Economic history of the United Kingdom
 Economy of India under Company rule
 Economy of India under the British Raj

References

History of the British Empire
British Empire